This is a list of species of reptiles and amphibian found on the British overseas territory of the Cayman Islands, located in the Greater Antilles chain in the Caribbean. The territory consists largely of three islands: Grand Cayman, Little Cayman, and Cayman Brac.

Amphibians

Frogs (Anura)

References

Cayman
Cayman
Cayman
Cayman